is a Japanese chemist. He is a fellow of Asahi Kasei Corporation and a professor at Meijo University in Nagoya. He created the first safe, production-viable lithium-ion battery which became used widely in cellular phones and notebook computers. Yoshino was awarded the Nobel Prize in Chemistry in 2019 alongside M. Stanley Whittingham and John B. Goodenough.

Early life and education
Yoshino was born in Suita, Japan, on 30 January 1948. He graduated from Kitano High School in Osaka City (1966). He earned a B.S. in 1970 and an M.S. degree in 1972, both in engineering from Kyoto University, and a Dr.Eng. degree from Osaka University in 2005.

During his college years, Yoshino had attended a course taught by Kenichi Fukui, the first Asian to become a Nobel Laureate in chemistry.

Career
Yoshino spent his entire non-academic career at Asahi Kasei Corporation. Immediately after graduating with his master's degree in 1972, Yoshino began working at Asahi Kasei. He began work in the Kawasaki Laboratory in 1982 and was promoted to manager of product development for ion batteries in 1992. In 1994, he became manager of technical development for the LIB manufacturer A&T Battery Corp., a joint venture company of Asahi Kasei and Toshiba. Asahi Kasei made him a fellow in 2003 and, in 2005, general manager of his own laboratory. Since 2017, he has been a professor at Meijo University and his status at Asahi Kasei has changed to honorary fellow.

Research

In 1981 Yoshino started doing research on rechargeable batteries using polyacetylene. Polyacetylene is the electroconductive polymer discovered by Hideki Shirakawa, who later (in 2000) would be awarded the Nobel Prize in Chemistry for its discovery.

In 1983 Yoshino fabricated a prototype rechargeable battery using lithium cobalt oxide (LiCoO) (discovered in 1979 by Godshall et al. at Stanford University, and John Goodenough and Koichi Mizushima at Oxford University) as cathode and polyacetylene as anode.  This prototype, in which the anode material itself contains no lithium, and lithium ions migrate from the LiCoO cathode into the anode during charging, was the direct precursor to the modern lithium-ion battery (LIB).

Polyacetylene had low real density which meant high capacity required large battery volume, and also had problems with instability, so Yoshino switched to carbonaceous material as anode and in 1985 fabricated the first prototype of the LIB and received the basic patent.

This was the birth of the current lithium-ion battery.

The LIB in this configuration was commercialized by Sony in 1991 and by A&T Battery in 1992. Yoshino described challenges and history of the invention process in a book chapter from 2014.

Yoshino discovered that carbonaceous material with a certain crystalline structure was suitable as anode material,  and this is the anode material that was used in the first generation of commercial LIBs.  Yoshino developed the aluminum foil current collector  which formed a passivation layer to enable high cell voltage at low cost, and developed the functional separator membrane  and the use of a positive temperature coefficient (PTC) device  for additional safety.

The LIB's coil-wound structure was conceived by Yoshino to provide large electrode surface area and enable high current discharge despite the low conductivity of the organic electrolyte.

In 1986 Yoshino commissioned the manufacture of a batch of LIB prototypes. Based on safety test data from those prototypes, the United States Department of Transportation (DOT) issued a letter stating that the batteries were different from the metallic lithium battery.

Recognition
1998 Chemical Technology Prize from the Chemical Society of Japan
1999: Battery Division Technology Award from The Electrochemical Society
2001: Ichimura Prizes in Industry—Meritorious Achievement Prize
2003: Commendation for Science and Technology by the Minister of Education, Culture, Sports, Science and Technology—Prize for Science and Technology, Development Category
2004: Medal with Purple Ribbon, from the Government of Japan
2011: Yamazaki-Teiichi Prize from the Foundation for Promotion of Material Science and Technology of Japan
2011: C&C Prize from the NEC C&C Foundation
2012 : IEEE Medal for Environmental and Safety Technologies from the IEEE
2013 : Global Energy Prize
2014 : Charles Stark Draper Prize
2018 : Japan Prize
2019 : European Inventor Award
2019 : Nobel Prize in Chemistry
2019 : Order of Culture

References

External links
 The father of lithium-ion batteries (Chemistry World, July 2018)
  including the Nobel Lecture 8 December 2019 Brief History and Future of Lithium-ion Batteries

1948 births
Living people
Draper Prize winners
Electrochemists
Japanese chemists
Japanese Nobel laureates
Kyoto University alumni
Nobel laureates in Chemistry
People from Suita
Recipients of the Medal with Purple Ribbon
Recipients of the Order of Culture
Osaka University alumni